Round 3 is Kim Hyun-joong's third Korean mini-album, which was released on July 22, 2013.

Background and development
Two days after the "2013 KHJ Show - Party People" fanmeeting in Seoul, Korea, KeyEast stated that Kim would be releasing his third mini-album Round 3 on July 22. Before its release, they pre-released three photo teasers: the first photo teaser shows his back muscles with Korean traditional pattern tattoos, the second photo teaser shows his intense gaze downwards with a tattoo on his neck, and finally the third photo teaser shows him staring at the camera with intense gaze, but the focus is on his torso, which is covered with a clearer tattoo, particularly a Korean goblin, emphasizing the mix of tradition and modern sounds. Jay Park and Dok2 participated in the lyric-making as well as featuring in the songs "Unbreakable" and "Your Story" respectively. In addition, both songs were created by Steven Lee, who produced Kim's previous Korean and Japanese albums. Also, "Unbreakable" was choreographed by Lyle Beniga and directed by Hong Won-ki, while "Your Story" was choreographed by Keone Madrid and directed by Jo Soo-hyun.

Release and promotion
On July 15, KeyEast announced that Kim Hyun Joong's new song and music video "Unbreakable" would be released on July 18 at 12 noon prior to the release of the album. Four days later, the "Your Story" MV teaser was released on July 22, together with its other tracks.

Track listing

Music videos
 Unbreakable (ft. Jay Park)
 Your Story (ft. Dok2)

Release history

Charts

References

External links
  Kim Hyun Joong discography
 

SS501 albums
2013 EPs